The 1966 Kentucky Derby was the 92nd running of the Kentucky Derby. The race took place on May 7, 1966.

Full results

References

1966
Kentucky Derby
Derby
Kentucky
Kentucky Derby